Central African Airways Flight 890, a Vickers Viscount 745D, crashed during a scheduled passenger flight from Wadi Halfa, Sudan, to Benghazi, Libya, about nine kilometers southeast of Benina International Airport in Libya. A total of forty-seven passengers and seven crew members were on board of whom only eighteen survived, making it the deadliest ever plane crash in Libya at the time of the accident. It still remains the deadliest accident for Central African Airways.

Cause of the crash

According to an International Civil Aviation Organization accident digest, the plane crashed while making a nighttime approach to runway 33R, and while flying in clouds the pilot descended below a safe altitude, causing the aircraft to crash into high ground. While the reason for the quick descent remains unknown, it is believed the pilot may have misinterpreted the reading of his altimeter as a result of fatigue and possible indisposition.

See also
 Aviation safety
 List of accidents and incidents involving commercial aircraft

References

External links
Accident description Aviation Safety Network

Aviation accidents and incidents in 1958
Accidents and incidents involving the Vickers Viscount
Aviation accidents and incidents in Libya
Airliner accidents and incidents involving controlled flight into terrain
Central African Airways accidents and incidents
1958 in Libya
August 1958 events in Africa